Romel Vaughn Wallen (born 29 June 1980) is a Jamaican former footballer. He is now a FIFA-licensed broker, based in the United Kingdom. He has emerged as a top sports agent for Caribbean football players who play professionally in United States and Europe. "Romel Wallen vs Phil Graham". Wallen brokered the #1 pick in the 2014 MLS SuperDraft.

Football career
Youth international and collegiate player; Wallen earned 21 caps representing Jamaica, primarily under the guidance of Jamaica's only FIFA World Cup coach, Brazilian, René Simões. Competed in the 1995/6 CONCACAF Under-17 Championship, hosted in Trinidad.

Education
Wallen was born in Kingston, Jamaica. A Wolmer's Schools graduate, also studied in United States, where he graduated from The Hotchkiss School in June 2000. After gaining a scholarship to attend #1 US liberal arts college, Williams College, he earned a bachelor's degree (BA) in Political Science and Psychology (2004).

Sports management
Wallen is founder of London-based sports brokerage, Pro Goals Sports Capital.

References

1980 births
Living people
 Hotchkiss School alumni
Williams College alumni
Jamaica international footballers
Expatriate soccer players in the United States
Jamaican footballers
Sportspeople from Kingston, Jamaica
Association footballers not categorized by position